This list of fossil fishes described in 2014 is a list of new taxa of placoderms, fossil cartilaginous fishes and bony fishess of every kind that have been described during the year 2014, as well as other significant discoveries and events related to paleontology of fishes that occurred in the year 2014. The list only includes taxa at the level of genus or species.

Research
 An overview of adaptations for locomotion in water in fossil fishes is published by Fletcher et al. (2014).
 New fossil material of the Cambrian chordate Metaspriggina walcotti is described by Conway Morris and Caron (2014), who reinterpret M. walcotti as a primitive fish.
 A study of relationships and character distributions of early gnathostomes, including placoderms and acanthodians, is published by Brazeau and Friedman (2014).
 Cranial anatomy of the placoderm Romundina stellina is described by Dupret et al. (2014).
 A specimen of the ischnacanthiform acanthodian Nerepisacanthus denisoni is described from the Late Silurian Bertie Formation of southern Ontario, Canada by Burrow and Rudkin (2014).
 A specimen of the acanthodian Acanthodes bridgei with preserved tissues of its eye, which provides the first record of mineralized rods and cones in a fossil, is described from the Late Carboniferous Hamilton Formation in Kansas, USA by Tanaka et al. (2014).
 An analysis of the fossil record of Carcharocles megalodon, intending to establish its date of extinction, is published by Pimiento and Clements (2014).
 A study of the phylogenetic relationships of the Triassic halecomorph Archaeosemionotus connectens is published by López-Arbarello, Stockar and Bürgin (2014).
 Triassic scanilepiform neopterygian species Fukangichthys longidorsalis is revised by Xu, Gao and Finarelli (2014).
 A study of the phylogenetic interrelationships of lampridiform teleosts and of their Late Cretaceous relatives, is published by Davesne et al. (2014).
 A virtual cranial endocast of the lungfish Rhinodipterus kimberleyensis from the Late Devonian Gogo Formation of Australia is presented by Clement and Ahlberg (2014).
 A study on the histology of the humerus of Eusthenopteron is published by Sanchez, Tafforeau & Ahlberg (2014).

New taxa

Newly named jawless vertebrates

Newly named placoderms

Newly named acanthodians

Newly named cartilaginous fishes

Newly named bony fishes

References

2010s in paleontology
Fish